Suresh Shankar Nadkarni (1934–1995) was an Indian banker, corporate executive and the chairman of the Securities and Exchange Board of India (SEBI). 

Prior to his assignment with SEBI, he headed the Industrial Credit and Investment Corporation of India (ICICI) and the Industrial Development Bank of India (IDBI). He was also serving as a director of the Life Insurance Corporation of India (LIC) from 1993. He was credited with efforts in streamlining the Indian securities market and in introducing measures to prevent illegal trading of stocks, including forward trading. 

The Government of India awarded him the third highest civilian honour, the Padma Bhushan, in 1989, for his contributions to society, making him the first banker so honoured. In 1992, he was chosen as the Goa World Man of the Year by Goa Today Magazine. He died on 31 January 1995, at the age of 60, succumbing to a heart attack.

References 

Recipients of the Padma Bhushan in trade and industry
1934 births
1995 deaths
Indian bankers
Indian corporate directors
Securities and Exchange Board of India
Businesspeople from Goa